Cole Hunt (born May 30, 1995) is a former American football tight end. He was signed by the Los Angeles Chargers as an undrafted free agent in 2018. He played college football at Rice and TCU.

Early life and career
Born in Bay City, Texas, Hunt grew up in El Campo, Texas with three siblings – including current Seattle Seahawks center Joey Hunt.  At El Campo High School, he was named 1st Team All-State playing defensive line as a senior in 2012 while leading the Ricebirds to a berth in the Texas 3A State Championship game.

On February 6, 2013, Hunt signed his letter of intent to play college football at Rice University in Houston, Texas.  He redshirted in the 2013 season at Rice, before totalling 13 receptions for 118 yards and a touchdown for the Owls in the 2014 and 2015 seasons. After graduating from Rice in three years with a degree in sports management, Hunt transferred to TCU in Fort Worth, Texas, where his older brother Joey had just finished his own college career.  At TCU, he totaled 12 receptions for 124 yards and a touchdown in his two seasons for the Horned Frogs, earning Honorable Mention All-Big 12 and 1st Team All-Academic Big 12 honors as a senior in 2017.

Professional career

Los Angeles Chargers
After going undrafted in the 2018 NFL Draft, Hunt signed with the Los Angeles Chargers on May 11, 2018 as an undrafted free agent. On September 1, 2018, he was released by the Chargers during final team cuts.

San Antonio Commanders
On December 7, 2018, Hunt signed with the San Antonio Commanders of the new Alliance of American Football.

Carolina Panthers
On April 30, 2019, Hunt signed with the Carolina Panthers. He was waived during final roster cuts on August 30, 2019.

St. Louis BattleHawks
In October 2019, Hunt was picked by the St. Louis BattleHawks in the open phase of the 2020 XFL Draft. He was placed on injured reserve on February 10, 2020. He had his contract terminated when the league suspended operations on April 10, 2020.

References

External links
 TCU Horned Frogs bio

Living people
1995 births
People from El Campo, Texas
Players of American football from Texas
American football tight ends
Rice Owls football players
TCU Horned Frogs football players
Los Angeles Chargers players
San Antonio Commanders players
Carolina Panthers players
St. Louis BattleHawks players